This article lists the presidents of the Chamber of Republics of the Federal Assembly of Yugoslavia.

List

See also
Parliament of Serbia and Montenegro (Parliament of Federal Republic of Yugoslavia)
List of presidents of the Chamber of Citizens of the Federal Assembly of Yugoslavia

Sources
Yugoslav ministries, etc – Rulers.org

Chamber of Republics, Presidents
Yugoslavia, Chamber of Republics